Ephestia inquietella is a species of snout moth in the genus Ephestia. It was described by Hans Zerny, in 1932. It is found in Morocco and Spain.

References

Phycitinae
Moths described in 1932
Phycitini